Eoacmaea pustulata is a species of sea snail, a true limpet, a marine gastropod mollusk in the family Eoacmaeidae, one of the families of true limpets.

Description

Distribution
This species occurs in the Caribbean Sea and in the Gulf of Mexico.

References

 Turgeon, D.D., et al. 1998. Common and scientific names of aquatic invertebrates of the United States and Canada. American Fisheries Society Special Publication 26 page(s): 56

Eoacmaeidae
Gastropods described in 1779